Finnan haddie (also known as Finnan haddock, Finnan, Finny haddock, Finny haddie or Findrum speldings) is cold-smoked haddock, representative of a regional method of smoking with green wood and peat in north-east Scotland.

Origin
The origin of finnan haddie is the subject of debate, as some sources attribute the origin to the hamlet of Findon, Aberdeenshire, (also sometimes called Finnan) near Aberdeen,  while others insist that the name is a corruption of the village name of Findhorn at the mouth of the River Findhorn in Moray.  The "dispute" goes back to the eighteenth century, although it is hard to trace, as adherents fail to acknowledge even the possibility of the alternative view (except for the etymology note in the Oxford English Dictionary). It may have been a popular dish in Aberdeenshire since at least as early as the 1640s.

Popularization
Although known and admired in Scotland for a long time, Finnan haddie became a popular food item in London only in the 1830s. In earlier times, because of the light smoking that the fish received, it did not have a long shelf life—by most contemporary estimates, at most three days (although some suggested no more than one day). Thus, although the fish was often available in Aberdeen "within twelve hours of being [caught]", the distance to London was at that time nearly insurmountable if spoilage was to be avoided.  The fish started making its first appearances in London when shipped by established mail coach, but became widely available with the construction of the railway link connecting Aberdeen to London in the 1840s. The association with Findon became strong because of the Aberdeen connection. Occasionally, confusion was so deep that Findon was referred to as Findhorn.

Use in modern cuisine
Finnan has a long association with the traditional Scottish fish soup Cullen skink, and most old Scottish recipe books cite Finnan haddie as the smoked haddock to be used for this dish.

The traditional preparation is to roast or grill the whole pieces of fish over high heat. Finnan haddie is also often served poached in milk for breakfast and is an important part of traditional kedgeree and the Arnold Bennett omelette.

In popular culture
Finnan haddie is used as a sexual double entendre in the Cole Porter song "My Heart Belongs to Daddy", and is mentioned in the Lew Pollack/Sidney D. Mitchell song "At the Codfish Ball", as well as in Otto Preminger's 1953 comedy The Moon Is Blue. It was also humorously referenced in the title of the 1942 Warner Brothers cartoon Fin'n Catty, directed by Chuck Jones, as well as the Paramount movie "Finn and Hattie" (1931).

See also

 Arbroath smokie
 Cullen skink
 List of smoked foods

References

Scottish cuisine
Fish processing
Scottish brands
Fishing in Scotland
Smoked fish